Renhe Area is an area and a town on the western side of Shunyi District, Beijing, China. It shares border with Shuangfeng Subdistrict and Nancai Town in the north, Lisui Town in the east, Liqiao Town in the south, and has a corridor between Wangquan Subdistrict and Liqiao Town that connects to land east of Capital Airport Subdistrict and Tianzhu Town. In the year 2020, it had a census population of 67,391.

History

Administrative divisions 

In the year 2021, Renhe Area had 17 subdivisions, of which 3 were communities and 14 were villages:

See also 

 List of township-level divisions of Beijing

References 

Shunyi District
Towns in Beijing
Areas of Beijing